Bicycle Madness is a young adult historical fiction novel by Jane Kurtz, with illustrations by Beth Peck. It involves real-life suffragist Frances Willard.

References 

2003 novels